Kenar Gusheh (also Romanized as Kenār Gūsheh; also known as Kaneh Gūsheh) is a village in Kenevist Rural District, in the Central District of Mashhad County, Razavi Khorasan Province, Iran. At the 2006 census, its population was 204, in 47 families.

References 

Populated places in Mashhad County